The canton of Saint-Germain-en-Laye is an administrative division of the Yvelines department, northern France. It was created at the French canton reorganisation which came into effect in March 2015. Its seat is in Saint-Germain-en-Laye.

It consists of the following communes:
Aigremont
Chambourcy
L'Étang-la-Ville
Mareil-Marly
Le Pecq
Saint-Germain-en-Laye

References

Cantons of Yvelines